Macon East Academy is a private PK-12 school in Cecil, Alabama.  It was established as a segregation academy in response to the racial desegregation of public schools and serves 287 students.

History
Macon Academy was founded in September 1963 in Tuskegee, Alabama (32.3743789,-85.6599105), seat of Macon County.   The school was a segregation academy. Under the direction of Governor George Wallace, the state provided scholarship money to support the school.

In 1995, in the midst of falling enrollments, the trustees moved the school to Cecil, Alabama, a suburb of Montgomery.

Campus
The campus, twenty miles east of Montgomery in a rural area, includes five buildings and outdoor athletic facilities.

References 

Private K-12 schools in Alabama
Educational institutions established in 1963
1963 establishments in Alabama
Segregation academies in Alabama
Education in Montgomery, Alabama